is a Japanese football player. She plays for Urawa Reds. She also plays for Japan national team.

Club career
Sugasawa was born in Chiba on October 5, 1990. She joined Albirex Niigata from JFA Academy Fukushima in 2008. In 2013, she moved to her local club JEF United Chiba. She became top scorer in 2014 and 2015. In 2017, she moved to Urawa Reds. She was selected Best Eleven 3 times (2014, 2015 and 2017).

National team career
On January 13, 2010, Sugasawa debuted for Japan national team against Denmark. In July, she was selected Japan U-20 national team for 2010 U-20 World Cup and she played 2 matches. She then scored the first goal for Japan senior team in a 2–0 victory over Denmark on March 2, 2012 which won the 2012 Algarve Cup. She was a member of Japan for 2015 World Cup and Japan won 2nd place. In Asia, she was also a member for 2014 and 2018 Asian Cup. Japan won the championship at both tournaments. She has played 84 games and scored 29 goals for Japan.

Career statistics

Club

International

International goals 

 Scores and results list Japan's goal tally first.

Honors
 FIFA Women's World Cup
 Runner-Up: 2015

 AFC Women's Asian Cup
 Champion: 2014, 2018

 Asian Games
 Gold medal: 2018
 Silver medal: 2014

 L.League
 Top scorers: 2014, 2015
 Best eleven: 2014, 2015

References

External links

Japan Football Association

1990 births
Living people
Association football people from Chiba Prefecture
Japanese women's footballers
Japan women's international footballers
Women's association football forwards
Nadeshiko League players
Albirex Niigata Ladies players
JEF United Chiba Ladies players
Urawa Red Diamonds Ladies players
2015 FIFA Women's World Cup players
Footballers at the 2014 Asian Games
Footballers at the 2018 Asian Games
Asian Games gold medalists for Japan
Asian Games silver medalists for Japan
Asian Games medalists in football
Medalists at the 2014 Asian Games
Medalists at the 2018 Asian Games
2019 FIFA Women's World Cup players
Footballers at the 2020 Summer Olympics
Olympic footballers of Japan
Nadeshiko League MVPs